Prosternini is a tribe of click beetles in the family Elateridae. There are at least 20 genera and 90 described species in North America, and others elsewhere.

North American genera

 Actenicerus Kiesenwetter, 1858 g b
 Anostirus C.G.Thomson, 1859 g b
 Anthracopteryx Horn, 1891 b
 Beckerus Johnson in Majka & Johnson, 2008 g b
 Corymbitodes Buysson, 1904 g b
 Ctenicera Latreille, 1829 i c g b
 Eanus Leconte, 1861 g b
 Hadromorphus Motschoulsky, 1859 g b
 Hypoganus Kiesenwetter, 1858 g b
 Liotrichus Kiesenwetter, 1858 g b
 Metanomus Buysson, 1887 g b
 Neopristilophus Buysson, 1894 g b
 Nitidolimonius Johnson in Majka & Johnson, 2008 g b
 Oxygonus LeConte g b
 Paractenicera Johnson in Majka & Johnson, 2008 g b
 Prosternon Latreille, 1834 g b
 Pseudanostirus Dolin, 1964 g b
 Selatosomus Stephens, 1830 g b
 Setasomus Gurjeva, 1985 g b
 Sylvanelater Johnson in Majka & Johnson, 2008 g b

Data sources: i = ITIS, c = Catalogue of Life, g = GBIF, b = Bugguide.net

References

Further reading

External links

 

Dendrometrinae
Insect tribes